Parasala is a small village in Jodhpur of , Rajasthan state, India.   NH is passing through Parassala to Kanyakumari. It has a senior secondary school and a government hospital.

Villages in Jodhpur district